Stéphane Bozzolo is a Paralympic athlete from France competing mainly in category P11 pentathlon events.

Biography
He competed in the 1996 Summer Paralympics in Atlanta, United States.  There he won a gold medal in the men's Long jump - F11 event, a silver medal in the men's Pentathlon - P11 event and finished fifth in the men's Triple jump - F11 event.  He also competed at the 2000 Summer Paralympics in Sydney, Australia.    There he won a gold medal in the men's Long jump - F12 event and a silver medal in the men's Pentathlon - P12 event.  He also competed at the 2004 Summer Paralympics in Athens, Greece.  There he finished eighth in the men's Javelin throw - F12 event, finished fifth in the men's Long jump - F12 event and did not finish in  the men's Pentathlon - P12 event.  He also competed in the 2008 Summer Paralympics in Beijing, China.  There he won a bronze medal in the men's 4 x 100 metre relay - T11-13 event, finished seventh in the men's Long jump - F12 event and finished fourth in the men's Pentathlon - P12 event	.

External links
 

Paralympic athletes of France
Athletes (track and field) at the 1996 Summer Paralympics
Athletes (track and field) at the 2000 Summer Paralympics
Athletes (track and field) at the 2004 Summer Paralympics
Athletes (track and field) at the 2008 Summer Paralympics
Paralympic gold medalists for France
Paralympic silver medalists for France
Paralympic bronze medalists for France
Living people
Medalists at the 1996 Summer Paralympics
Medalists at the 2000 Summer Paralympics
Medalists at the 2008 Summer Paralympics
Year of birth missing (living people)
Paralympic medalists in athletics (track and field)
French male sprinters
French male long jumpers
French pentathletes
Visually impaired sprinters
Visually impaired long jumpers
Paralympic sprinters
Paralympic long jumpers
20th-century French people
21st-century French people